February 18 - Eastern Orthodox liturgical calendar - February 20

All fixed commemorations below are observed on March 4 (March 3 on leap years) by Eastern Orthodox Churches on the Old Calendar.

For February 19th, Orthodox Churches on the Old Calendar commemorate the Saints listed on February 6.

Saints

 Apostles Archippus and Philemon of the Seventy Apostles, and Martyr Apphia (1st century)
 Martyrs Maximus, Theodotus, Hesychius, and Asclepiodota of Adrianopolis (305-311)
 Venerable Saints Eugene and Macarius, Priests, Confessors at Antioch (363)
 Saint Mesrop the Translator, of Armenia (439)  (see also: February 17 - Greek)
 Venerable Rabulas of Samosata (c. 530)
 Venerable Conon, Abbot in Palestine (555)
 Saint Dositheus of Gaza, disciple of Saint Abba Dorotheus (7th century)
 Venerable Sophronios, Bishop.

Pre-Schism Western saints

 Saint Gabinus, a martyr in Rome who was related to the Emperor Diocletian, but also the brother of Pope Gaius, and father of the martyr St Susanna (c. 295)
 Saint Quodvultdeus, Bishop of Carthage in North Africa, exiled by the Arian Genseric King of the Vandals after the capture of the city in 439 (450)
 Saint Valerius (Valére), Bishop of Antibes in the south of France (c. 450)
 Saint Odran, ranks as the first Christian martyr in Irish history (c. 452)
 Saints Publius, Julian, Marcellus and Companions, martyrs in North Africa.
 Saint Barbatus of Benevento, took part in the Sixth Oecumenical Council in Constantinople at which Monothelitism was condemned (682)
 Saint Mansuetus, Archbishop of Milan and Confessor, he wrote a treatise against Monothelitism (c. 690)
 Saint Beatus of Liébana, a monk at Liebana and was famous for his firm stand against Adoptionism (789)
 Saint George of Lodève, a monk at Saint-Foi-de-Conques in Rouergue but later moved to Vabres and became Bishop of Lodève (c. 884)

Post-Schism Orthodox saints

 Saint Yaroslav the Wise, son of the Varangian (Viking) Grand Prince Vladimir the Great (1054)  (see also: February 20 - Slavonic; and February 28)
 New Nun-martyr Philothea of Athens (1588)
 Venerable Theodore, Abbot of Sanaxar Monastery (1791)
 New Hieromartyr Nicetas, Hieromonk, of Epirus and Mt. Athos, at Serres (1809)  (see also: April 4)
 Saint Maria, desert-dweller of Olonets (1860) (see also: February 9)
 Saint Nikanor (Savić) the New, Abbot of Hilandar (1990)

New martyrs and confessors

 New Hieromartyr Vladimir (Terentiev), Abbot, of Zosima Hermitage, Smolensk (1933)
 New Martyr Demetrius Volkov (1942)

Other commemorations

 Icon of the Mother of God of Cyprus (392)  (see also: February 16)

Icon gallery

Notes

References

Sources
 February 19 / March 4. Orthodox Calendar (Pravoslavie.ru).
 March 4 / February 19. Holy Trinity Russian Orthodox Church (A parish of the Patriarchate of Moscow).
 February 19. OCA - The Lives of the Saints.
 The Autonomous Orthodox Metropolia of Western Europe and the Americas. St. Hilarion Calendar of Saints for the year of our Lord 2004. St. Hilarion Press (Austin, TX). p. 16.
 The Nineteenth Day of the Month of February. Orthodoxy in China.
 February 19. Latin Saints of the Orthodox Patriarchate of Rome.
 The Roman Martyrology. Transl. by the Archbishop of Baltimore. Last Edition, According to the Copy Printed at Rome in 1914. Revised Edition, with the Imprimatur of His Eminence Cardinal Gibbons. Baltimore: John Murphy Company, 1916. pp. 52-53.
 Rev. Richard Stanton. A Menology of England and Wales, or, Brief Memorials of the Ancient British and English Saints Arranged According to the Calendar, Together with the Martyrs of the 16th and 17th Centuries. London: Burns & Oates, 1892. p. 78.

Greek Sources
 Great Synaxaristes:  19 Φεβρουαρίου. Μεγασ Συναξαριστησ.
  Συναξαριστής. 19 Φεβρουαρίου. Ecclesia.gr. (H Εκκλησια Τησ Ελλαδοσ).

Russian Sources
  4 марта (19 февраля). Православная Энциклопедия под редакцией Патриарха Московского и всея Руси Кирилла (электронная версия). (Orthodox Encyclopedia - Pravenc.ru).
  19 февраля (ст.ст.) 4 марта 2014 (нов. ст.). Русская Православная Церковь Отдел внешних церковных связей. (DECR).

February in the Eastern Orthodox calendar